Drifting is a driving technique where the driver intentionally oversteers, with loss of traction, while maintaining control and driving the car through the entirety of a corner. The technique causes the rear slip angle to exceed the front slip angle to such an extent that often the front wheels are pointing in the opposite direction to the turn (e.g. car is turning left, wheels are pointed right or vice versa, also known as opposite lock or counter-steering). Drifting is traditionally done by clutch kicking (where the clutch is rapidly disengaged and re-engaged with the intention of upsetting the grip of the rear wheels), then intentionally oversteering and countersteering. This sense of drift is not to be confused with the four wheel drift, a classic cornering technique established in Grand Prix and sports car racing.

As a motoring discipline, drifting competitions were first popularized in Japan in the 1970s and further popularized by the 1995 manga series Initial D. Drifting competitions are held worldwide and are judged according to the speed, angle, showmanship, and line taken through a corner or set of corners.

History

Origin 
Despite the popular belief that drifting originated in 1970s Japan, this driving technique was first practiced in Europe before 1950. Automotive icon Enzo Ferrari credits Italian driver Tazio Nuvolari as being the inventor of the four-wheel drift.  Later, British racing driver Stirling Moss improved upon Nuvorali's technique, mastering the art of drifting through curves in Formula 1 races by steering with the accelerator pedal. More recently, drifting as a specialized competition became popular in Japan. It was most popular in the All Japan Touring Car Championship races. Famous motorcyclist turned driver Kunimitsu Takahashi was the foremost creator of drifting techniques in the 1970s. This earned him several championships and a legion of fans who enjoyed the spectacle of smoking tires. The bias-ply racing tires of the 1960s–1980s lent themselves to driving styles with a high slip angle. As professional racers in Japan drove this way, so did street racers.

Tsuchiya began practicing his drifting skills on the mountain roads of Japan, and quickly gained a reputation amongst the racing crowd. In 1987, several popular car magazines and tuning garages agreed to produce a video of Tsuchiya's drifting skills. The video, known as Pluspy, became a hit and inspired many of the professional drifting drivers on the circuits today. In 1988, alongside Option magazine founder and chief editor Daijiro Inada, he helped to organize one of the first events specifically for drifting called the Ikaten (short for Ikasu Hashiriya Team Tengoku). He has also drifted through every turn in Tsukuba Circuit.

Popularity 
One of the earliest recorded drift events outside Japan took place in 1996 at Willow Springs Raceway in Willow Springs, California, hosted by the Japanese drifting magazine and organization Option. Daijiro Inada (founder of the Japanese D1 Grand Prix), the NHRA Funny Car drag racer Kenji Okazaki, and Keiichi Tsuchiya gave demonstrations in a Nissan 180SX that the magazine had brought over from Japan. Entrants included Rhys Millen and Bryan Norris. Drifting has since exploded into a form of motorsport in North America, Australia, Asia and Europe.  Grassroots drifting has seen a huge increase in popularity in the 21st century, which has in turn caused prices of FR cars to increase and parts become more scarce.

Drifting has evolved into a competitive sport where drivers compete (almost exclusively in rear-wheel-drive cars) to earn points from judges based on various factors. At the top levels of competition, IDCR in Worldwide, the D1 Grand Prix in Japan pioneered the sport. Other events such as Drift Games Extreme (formally known as the IDC — Irish Drift Championship) in Ireland, Formula D in the United States, Drift Allstars, King of Europe, Drift Masters and the British Drift Championship in Europe, WDS in China, RDS in Russia, Formula Drift Asia in the Malaysia/Singapore/Thailand/Indonesia, NZ Drift Series in New Zealand, the Australian Drifting Grand Prix, Spec - D Drift Series in Western Canada and the Greek Drift Championship (Drift Wars) have come along to further expand it into a legitimate motorsport worldwide. Drivers within these series are able to keep their cars sliding for extended periods of time, often linking several turns.

Drift competition 

Judging takes place on just a small part of the circuit, a few linking corners that provide good viewing, and opportunities for drifting. The rest of the circuit is irrelevant, but it pertains to controlling the temperature of the tires and setting the car up for the first judged corner. In tandem passes, the lead driver (in the lead car, Senko) often feints their entry to the first corner to upset the chase driver (in the chase car, Atooi); however, in some European series, this practice is frowned upon by judges and considered foul play, resulting in deduction of points.

There are typically two sessions – a qualifying or practice session, and a final session. This is often on the day preceding the final.

The finals are tandem passes called . Drivers are paired off, and each heat comprises two passes, with each driver taking a turn to lead. The best of the eight heats go to the next four, to the next two, to the final. The passes are judged as explained above; however, there are some provisos such as:

 Overtaking the lead car under drift conditions is frowned upon even if the chasing car doesn't interrupt the lead car's drift.
 Overtaking the lead car under grip conditions automatically forfeits a pass.
 Spinning forfeits a pass, unless the other driver also spins.
 Increasing the lead under drift conditions helps to win a pass.
 Maintaining a close gap while chasing under drift conditions helps to win a pass.
The level of smoke from the tires is also a factor.

Points are awarded for each pass, and usually, one driver prevails. Sometimes, the judges cannot agree, or cannot decide, or a crowd vocally disagrees with the judge's decision. In such cases, more passes may be run until a winner is produced. On occasion, mechanical failure determines the battle's outcome, either during or preceding a heat. If a car cannot enter a tandem battle, the remaining entrant (who automatically advances) will give a solo demonstration pass. In the event of apparently close or tied runs, crowds often demonstrate their desire for another run with chants of 'one more time'.

Commitment is about how much throttle the driver applies, and the confidence and dedication the driver shows when approaching track edges and barriers. The higher the rate-to-angle, the more speed and angle a driver can carry through the course. In addition, the fewer corrections they apply through the course and the closer they drive to the track edges or barriers, the higher their style score.

Outside Japan 
There is some regional variation. For example, in Australia, the chase car is judged on how accurately it emulates the drift of the lead car, as opposed to being judged on its own merit — this is only taken into consideration by the judges if the lead car is on the appropriate racing line. Other variations of the tansō/tsuisō and the tansō-only method is multi-car group judging, seen in Drift Tengoku videos where the four-car team is judged in groups.

The D1GP drift series has been prototyping and fine-tuning an electronic judging system based on custom sensors that record and transmit car data to a computer that judges the run. This system is also being tested in some European series. It is designed to remove subjectivity and/or predisposition of judges. Usually the track for such a system is broken up into several sections (usually three) and the system automatically generates scores based on speed, angle and fluidity of the driver in each section, combining the scores for the final score. In certain situations judges can change or overrule a score, which happens, though rarely.

Formula Drift is the top United States Drifting series. Its judging style for competition is based on line, angle, and speed. When judging for line the driver is judged based on their ability to stay on the line set in place by the judges. Points are allocated to outside zones and inner clips, and are also allocated to touch and go areas. Angle is the drivers ability to maintain a high level of angle that will be set by the angle judge in the drivers meeting. Style is judged based on three areas of focus; initiation, fluidity, and commitment. Initiation is based on how early and smooth the driver initiates into a drift. Fluidity is how smooth the driver drives from lock to lock, high angles of drift, and just overall smoothness on the track. Commitment is judged on consistent throttle throughout, and how close the driver is willing to get to walls and clipping points.
The King of Europe Drift ProSeries has developed its own telemetry system, which uses GPS data to accurately measure speed, angle and line, thus leading to a very objective result for the qualifying sessions.

Drift cars 

Drift cars are usually light- to moderate-weight rear-wheel-drive coupes and sedans, offering a large range of power levels. There have also been all-wheel drive cars that have been converted to rear-wheel drive such as the Subaru WRX, Toyota Avensis, Scion tC, Mitsubishi Lancer Evolution, Dodge Charger, and Nissan GT-R. Early on, AWD cars without conversion were allowed in some drifting competitions, and usually the rules allowed only a certain percentage of power to be sent to the front wheels, but they are banned in most (if not all) drifting competitions today.

Despite the possibility of obtaining desirable Japanese domestic market vehicles in continents outside Japan, drifters in other countries prefer to use local versions of the same cars (for example, a Nissan 240SX instead of a Nissan Silvia S13, etc.), or even domestic cars. A high volume of Japanese imports were brought to countries such as Australia and New Zealand, however it is not unusual to see Australian/New Zealand domestic vehicles such as the Holden Commodore or Ford Falcon used in drifting competitions.

The American market saw a relatively high volume of JDM cars being imported over the last decade, despite Japanese domestic vehicles being right-hand-drive only. Locally-sold imports such as the Lexus SC and Nissan 240SX feature heavily in American drifting, but they are usually modified with JDM engines to mirror their Japanese domestic equivalents (usually with a Toyota JZ-GTE or Nissan CA18DET/SR20DET/RB26DETT respectively).

In the UK, there are a high level of Japanese imports used within the drifting scene, due in part to the UK sharing a right-hand drive layout with Japan. However, these cars often cost more than UK-market cars, partly due to import costs. There are plenty of UK and European models used as drift cars as well — older BMWs are particularly prominent due to cost and availability, with Volvo 300 series and Ford Sierras also proving popular.

In the Formula Drift Professional series, cars range from highly tuned Japanese automobiles reflecting the original styles of drifting to all-new age makes and models. Due to no power limit restrictions in the series, it is not uncommon for competitors to use a variety of different powerplants. Popular variations of Chevrolet LS engines are often seen bolted down to Japanese frames.

In the King of Europe Drift Series, the main professional drift series in Europe, BMW models have long ruled the scene, winning event after event, year after year. The most successful models include the E30, E36 and E46, which also present an advantage in cost (being more affordable than their Japanese rivals). For a few years, BMW V8 engine swaps were the most popular, providing a healthy 300 to 400 horsepower output. With the continuous evolution of the sport, however, these have now become obsolete, making way for more powerful American V8 engines or classic Nissan RB26DETT and Toyota 2JZ-GTE engines.

As an example, the top 15 cars in the 2003 D1GP, top 10 in the 2004 D1GP, and top 10 in the 2005 D1GP were as follows:

The top cars in the Red Bull Drifting Championship were as follows:

As for 2017, the top cars participating in Formula Drift are the Nissan 370Z, Nissan Silvia S14, Nissan Silvia S15, Toyota 86, BMW E46, Ford Mustang, and the Mazda MX-5.

Drift tuning

Drivetrain 
A mechanical limited slip differential (LSD) is considered essential for drifting. Drifting with an open or viscous differential in a sustained slide generally yields relatively less impressive results. All other modifications are secondary to the LSD. The preferred form of LSD for drifting is the clutch type, in "two-way" form, for its consistent and aggressive lockup behavior under both acceleration and deceleration. Some drift cars use a spool "differential", which actually has no differential action at all — the wheels are locked to each other. Drifters on a budget may use a welded differential, where the side gears are welded to give the same effect as a spool. This makes it easier to break rear traction, because it reduces maximum traction in all situations except traveling in a straight line. Welded differentials have an inherent risk involved: due to the tremendous amount of internal stress, the welds may fail and the differential completely lock up leaving the rear wheels immobilized. Helical torque-sensing differentials such as the Torsen or Quaife (available on cars in certain stock trims such as the S15, FD3S, MX-5, JZA80, and UZZ3x) are also adequate. It is common for drifters to change the final gear ratio depending on the type of track layout.

The clutches on drift cars tend to be very tough ceramic-brass button or multiple-plate varieties for durability, as well as to allow rapid "clutch kick" techniques to upset the grip of the rear wheels. Gearbox and engine mounts are often replaced with urethane or aluminum mounts, and dampers are added to control the violent motion of the engine and gearbox under these conditions. The driveshafts are often replaced with carbon fiber drive shafts, as they offer the highest rotational mass savings, are stronger than alternative metals, and flexible enough to absorb and dissipate vibrations, thus easing the load on the gearbox as well as the rest of the drivetrain.

Gear sets may be replaced with closer ratios to keep the engine in the power band, or, on some cars that produce enough power and torque to four-gear transmissions similar to the ones used in NASCAR (such as the Andrews four-speed dog box that Vaughn Gittin Jr. ran in his 2016 Mustang) with more open-ratio gears, this limits the number of shifts the driver has to do during their run. These may be coarser dog engagement straight cut gears instead of synchronised helical gears, for durability and faster shifting at the expense of noise and refinement. Wealthier drifters may use sequential gearboxes to make gear selection easier and faster, while sequential shift lever adapters can be used to make shifts easier without increasing shift time.

Steering and suspension 
Steering angles are also crucial as the driver progresses. The first stage of these modifications is usually a modified steering knuckle or upright. Extended control arms can be employed on MacPherson strut vehicles like the Nissan S-Chassis to allow for more clearance for higher steering angles. Many aftermarket companies have developed full lock kits including modification of the vehicle's original scrub radius, kingpin axis, Ackermann angle, amount of bump steer, caster angle, and kinematics as to maximize front grip and eliminate mechanical bind at steering angles in excess of 60°. While MacPherson strut vehicles are prevalent in professional drifting, double wishbone suspension vehicles can also be competitive, with often better caster and camber curves.

Springs and shock absorbers are also tuned for higher skill levels, depending on track layout, which is included on almost all production cars. While Ackermann geometry is helpful in making a car turn easier, it inhibits the ability to slide sideways at full lock necessary to compete in drifting.

Cockpit 
Because of the high centrifugal forces encountered during drifting, drivers are usually retained by a racing seat and five-point harness. This allows the hands to merely turn the wheel, instead of bracing the body in the seat. The same applies for the feet, which are free to move rapidly between clutch, brake and accelerator pedals. The steering wheel is usually relatively small, dished, and perfectly round, so that it can be released and allowed to spin in the driver's hands as the caster returns the front wheels to center. The locking knob on the hand brake is usually replaced with a spin turn knob; this stops the hand brake locking on when pulled. Nearly all drivers move the hand brake location or add an extra hydraulic hand brake actuator for greater braking force. Additional gauges are used to monitor boost levels, oil pressure and temperature, intake and coolant temperatures, and air-fuel ratio, among other data. Some drivers, especially in larger cars, move the seating position for a better weight distribution, such as Daigo Saito and his 2014 JZX100 Mk.II Chaser.

Tires 

In the United States, competitive drifters are required to run USDOT-approved (road-legal) tires similar to racing slicks in rubber composition, but with shallow treads included. This is permitted, with the exception of some major championships including D1GP and Formula Drift, which only permit commercially available tires that are approved by the sanctioning body. Professional drifting has come to the point where grip is tuned into cars to be defeated. It makes for a faster drift necessary in the current professional climate. Tires typically used by drifters are around the DOT tread wear rating of 200. Examples include the Hankook Ventus RS-3, Falken Azenis RT615K, Nitto NT05, Yokohama ADVAN Neova AD08R, and Achilles Radial 123s. Some other companies from Asia have also started developing their technology through sponsoring professional drivers. These companies include Nankang, Westlake and Zestino. Tires are often modified with lettering to give them a more customized look.

R/C drifting 
R/C drifting refers to the act of drifting with a radio-controlled car. R/C cars are equipped with special low-grip tires, usually made from PVC or ABS piping. Some manufacturers make radial drift tires that are made of actual rubber compounds. The car's setup is usually changed to allow it to drift more easily. R/C drifting is most successful on AWD R/C cars. However, RWD chassis drift cars offer the most realistic experience.  Companies such as Overdose, Yokomo, MST, Tamiya, Team Associated, and Hobby Products International have made dedicated drift cars and supported the hobby.

In the media

Film and television 
One of the key sources responsible for the international spread of drifting is the Japanese manga and anime series Initial D, which features Takumi Fujiwara, a high school student who learns to drift on the Mt. Akina tōge (mountain pass) using a custom Toyota AE86. The series features a large number of Japanese performance vehicles, including the Mazda RX-7, the Nissan Skyline, the Toyota Supra, the Toyota MR-2, the Mazda MX-5 and many other vehicles.

Hollywood embraced the drifting subculture in the film The Fast and the Furious: Tokyo Drift (2006).

Paul Newman's character Doc Hudson, a 1951 Fabulous Hudson Hornet in Cars (2006), uses drifting techniques on a dirt track in the desert to demonstrate his skills to skeptical NASCAR rookie Lightning McQueen.

The 2017 film Baby Driver features an extended drifting chase scene in which Ansel Elgort's eponymous character drives a Subaru WRX to evade the police after a bank robbery.

The 2019 Netflix television series Hyperdrive is a reality competition show that focuses heavily on drifting, won by Diego Higa of Brazil.

Computer and console gaming 
Drifting's popularity in computer games extends back to early arcade racers where techniques for games such as Sega Rally and Ridge Racer involved drifting. The technique is now considered mainstream in modern games in all their forms. In-game communities have developed within games such as Assetto Corsa, Forza Motorsport and Gran Turismo, made up of teams who battle in user-created tournaments.

Assetto Corsa has become a popular choice for many due to the simulator featuring true to life physics that can translate to real world driving and the ever expanding variety of Championships it offers. Some of the most notable include the Virtual Drift Championship, The Drift Corner Grand Prix, and more recently the eSports Drifting Championship. Some championships have also been created by real world event organizers such as the Drift Masters Virtual Championship. Assetto Corsa is also extremely modifiable with individual players able to create their own custom built cars and tracks from scratch. Many models are controversially pulled from games such as Forza Motorsport 7 and then modified to fit the needs of the driver. The data that drives these cars is also completely customizable, allowing players to recreate engines from real world dynomometer data as well as suspension geometry. This results in an extremely realistic simulation of each vehicle when data is created accurately. Championships often scrutinize car data closely and are constantly aiming to more accurately depict the features of a virtual cars real life counterpart. Because of this, drivers are beginning to use Assetto Corsa as a tool to practice for real world championships.

Drifting also features heavily in the Need for Speed franchise (notably games since Need for Speed: Underground), the Grid franchise, the Juiced franchise and in Japanese domestic console games such as Initial D: Extreme Stage (PS3), which is based solely on drifting. It has become mainstream enough that there are also indie games about drifting such as Absolute Drift.

Drifting and the related technique of powersliding feature heavily in the Mario Kart franchise, where a successful drift or powerslide around corners will award the player with a short nitrous boost known as a "mini-turbo", with longer drifts awarding a slightly longer speed boost. Similar gameplay mechanics also exist in games from the Asphalt series, where drifting and other fast-paced vehicular maneuvers are a recurring theme.

Browser-based games include the popular Drift Hunters, NZ Performance Car's Drift Legends (the first online game to feature real racetracks, and now ported to iPhone/iPod touch) and Mercedes-AMG’s Wintersport Drift Competition (the first manufacturer-backed drifting game). Drifting games for mobile devices are readily available from major developers and independent studios.

Documentaries 
High Performance Imports. Volume 10 features Australian journalists from express publications, and Australian professional drifter Darren Appleton traveling to Japan, purchasing a drift vehicle (Nissan R32 GTS-T four-door), traveling with the likes of D1 champions and entering a drift event.

In 2011 Phil Morisson and James Robinson of Driftworks embarked on a journey to Japan where they would shoot a documentary about the local drifting scene, which would become known to the public as "Outsiders".

See also 
 Opposite lock
 Tafheet—illegal street drifting in Arab countries.
 Fishtailing
 Handbrake turn
 Jackknifing
 Scandinavian flick
 Slip, similar technique applied to aircraft in flight, in which an aircraft is travelling somewhat sideways while moving forward
 Spinning (motorsport)

References

External links 

 
Driving techniques
Motorsport terminology
Sports originating in Japan
Articles containing video clips